Bullitt Central High School is a secondary school located at 1330 Highway 44 East in the city of Shepherdsville, Kentucky, United States. Formed in 1970, it is part of the Bullitt County Public Schools district located in Bullitt County Kentucky.

References

Schools in Bullitt County, Kentucky
Public high schools in Kentucky
Educational institutions established in 1970
1970 establishments in Kentucky